The 1927 Railway Cup Hurling Championship was the inaugural series of the inter-provincial hurling Railway Cup. Two matches were played between 26 November 1926 and 17 March 1927. It was contested by Connacht, Leinster and Munster.

Leinster were the inaugural winners of the Railway Cup after defeating Connacht in the semi-final and Munster in the final at Croke Park, Dublin on 17 March 1927.

Leinster's Din O'Neill was the Railway Cup top scorer with 5-04.

Teams

Results

Semi-final

Final

Top scorers

Top scorers overall

Sources

 Donegan, Des, The Complete Handbook of Gaelic Games (DBA Publications Limited, 2005).

References

Railway Cup Hurling Championship
Railway Cup Hurling Championship